Barbara Rentler (born between 1947 and 1948) is a businesswoman, and the current CEO of Fortune 500 company, Ross Stores Inc.

Career

Rentler joined Ross Stores in February 1986. She held a variety of merchandising jobs until February 2001, when she became Senior Vice President and General Merchandise Manager at Ross Dress for Less. Rentler held those positions until January 2004, when she became Senior Vice President and Chief Merchandising Officer at dd's DISCOUNTS.

From February 2005 until December 2006, Rentler served as Executive Vice President and Chief Merchandising Officer of dd's DISCOUNTS. Beginning in December 2006 Rentler took on the responsibility of Executive Vice President of Merchandising. She was responsible for all Ross Apparel and Apparel-related products.

In December 2009, she was appointed the President and Chief Merchandising Officer at Ross Dress for Less. After less than five years, Rentler was promoted to chief executive officer on May 7, 2014. On June 1, 2014, she took over as CEO upon the retirement of the previous CEO, Michael Balmuth.

Rentler was the only woman among 100 individuals named to Forbes' "America's Most Innovative Leaders" list in 2019.

In March 2021, Ross Stores announced her appointment as Vice Chair, effective May 19, 2021.

References

1958 births
Living people
American women chief executives
American chief executives of Fortune 500 companies
20th-century American businesspeople
21st-century American businesspeople
American corporate directors
Women corporate directors
American retail chief executives
20th-century American businesswomen
21st-century American businesswomen